Razm is an Iranian 120 mm heavy mortar unveiled in 2010 and produced by Iran's Defense Industries Organization. It is a long range mortar with range of 16 km with rocket-assisted munitions and can be used alongside tube artillery. To achieve this range, Razm uses an unusually long barrel, and is very heavy. The overall design of the mortar is similar to that of 120 mm HM 16.

References

Mortars of Iran
120mm mortars
Artillery of Iran
Military equipment introduced in the 2010s